Anmer is a village in Norfolk, England, UK.

Anmer may refer to:

 Anmer (horse), a racehorse 
 José Anmer Paredes (born 1984) Venezuelan male model

See also